Rio (Río, formerly , Rhíon; Latin: Rhium) is a town in the suburbs of Patras and a former municipality in Achaea, West Greece, Greece. Since the 2011 local government reform it is part of the municipality Patras, of which it is a municipal unit. The municipal unit has an area of 98.983 km2. The municipal unit had a population of 14,622 in 2011. The campus of the University of Patras and the Casino Rio is located in Rio.

Geography 

Rion is the northernmost municipal unit of the Peloponnese peninsula. It stretches along the southeastern coast of the Gulf of Patras, about 7 km northeast of Patras city centre. The nearby Strait of Rio, crossed by the Rio–Antirrio bridge, separates the Gulf of Patras from the Gulf of Corinth to the east. The town is dominated by the Panachaiko mountain to the southeast.

Town layout

The town centre is also known as Agios Georgios Riou. This is where the Rio railway station, on the line from Patras to Corinth, is located. The quarter Kastellokampos lies to the southwest of the centre. The ferry terminals, with services to Antirrio, are in the north, on both sides of the Rio–Antirrio bridge. There is a large fortress with bastions next to the bridge. The campus of the University of Patras and the hospital lie in the southeast, across the Greek National Road 8A. There are sandy beaches along the coast, and a port north of town centre.

Subdivisions
The municipal unit Rio is subdivided into the following communities (constituent villages in brackets):
Agios Vasileios
Aktaio
Ano Kastritsi
Arachovitika (Arachovitika, Kato Arachovitika)
Argyra
Drepano
Kato Kastritsi (Kato Kastritsi, Magoula)
Pititsa
Platani
Psathopyrgos (Psathopyrgos, Kato Rodini)
Rio
Sella

History 

The earliest attested form of the word is the Mycenaean Greek , ri-jo, written in Linear B syllabic script.

The site of Rio has been a strategic point since antiquity. Early 19th century, there stood an old Turkish castle (the "Castle of the Morea") at the cape, with a small settlement outside its walls.

Government 

The mayors of the municipality were:

 Vasileios Zervas (1998–2006)
 Christos Liakopoulos (2006–2010)

Population

Gallery

See also 

List of settlements in Achaea

References

External links 
Municipality of Rio 
GTP - Rio
GTP - Municipality of Rio
GTP - Ancient Rhium

 
Populated places in Achaea
Mediterranean port cities and towns in Greece